Major General (Retd) Mohammad Humayun Kabir, OSP, SUP, rcds, psc, was a two-star general of the Bangladesh Army. As Major General he served as the Commander Logistics Area Dhaka Cantonment of Bangladesh Army. He served in various command and headquarters formations. He served as Adjutant General of Bangladesh Army, Commandant of the Bangladesh Military Academy, the Director of Military Operations-Army headquarters and also the General Officer Commanding (GOC) of 55 Infantry division and  
17 Infantry division.

Education 
He holds three master's degrees, in international security and strategy from King's College London (2013); in business administration from the University of Dhaka (2002-2005); and in defence studies from Bangladesh National University (1998-1999).  He is also a graduate of the Royal College of Defence Studies, United Kingdom (2012-2013), and the United States Army Command and General Staff College (1999-2000).

Military career 
Humayan Kabir was commissioned as an officer in the 13th BMA Long Course in December 1985. He held staff positions in the field and at headquarters.
As a Brigadier General, he commanded an infantry brigade and later went onto serve as Director of Military Operations Directorate for the Bangladesh Army. He has served as Commandant of the Bangladesh Military Academy.
After promotion to the rank of Major General he commanded 17 infantry division (Sylhet) from 2013 to 2016.

UN Mission 
Kabir served as a military observer with the United Nations Organization Mission in the Democratic Republic of the Congo (MONUC) from 2002 to 2003, and with the United Nations Protection Force (UNPROFOR) from 1995 to 1996.

On 26 July 2016 UN Secretary-General Ban Ki-moon appointed Major General Mohammad Humayun Kabir as Force Commander of the United Nations Peacekeeping Force in Cyprus (UNFICYP). He succeeded Major General Kristin Lund, the first female Force Commander in the UN.

Personal life 
Mohammad Humayun Kabir was born in 1965. He is married and has three sons. He is married to Tazrin Sultana.

References 

1965 births
Living people
University of Dhaka alumni
Alumni of King's College London
United Nations military personnel
Bangladesh Army generals